The 2013–14 network television schedule for the five major English commercial broadcast networks in Canada covers primetime hours from September 2013 through August 2014. The schedule is followed by a list per network of returning series, new series, and series canceled after the 2012-13 television season, for Canadian, American and other series.

CTV Two and Global are not included on Saturday as they normally only schedule encore programming in primetime on Saturdays.

Legend 
 Light blue indicates Local Programming.
 Grey indicates Encore Programming.
 Light green indicates sporting events.
 Red indicates Canadian content shows, which is programming that originated in Canada.
 Magenta indicates series being burned off and other irregularly scheduled programs, including specials.
 Cyan indicates various programming.
 Light yellow indicates the current schedule.

Schedule 
 New series are highlighted in bold. Series that have changed network are not highlighted as new series.
 All times given are in Canadian Eastern Time and Pacific Time (except for some live events or specials, including most sports, which are given in Eastern Time).

Sunday

Monday

Tuesday

Wednesday 

Note: CTV aired The Tomorrow People at 7 p.m. during the fall.

Thursday

Friday

Saturday

See also
 2013–14 United States network television schedule

References

 
 
Canadian television schedules